The 1996 Grote Prijs Jef Scherens was the 30th edition of the Grote Prijs Jef Scherens cycle race and was held on 1 September 1996. The race started and finished in Leuven. The race was won by Jans Koerts.

General classification

References

1996
1996 in road cycling
1996 in Belgian sport